Holguin or Holguín may refer to:

Places
 Holguín - a city in Cuba.
 Holguín Province in Cuba.

People
 Jeffrey Holguin (born in 1978) is an American sport shooter.
 Jorge Holguín (1848–1928) was a Colombian politician and military officer, and two time Acting President of Colombia.
 Jose L. Holguin (1921–1994) - was a United States Air Force Colonel.
 Juan Ignacio Larrea Holguín (1927–2006) was archbishop of Guayaquil.
 María Ángela Holguín (born in 1963) is the Minister of Foreign Affairs of Colombia.
 Pedro Álvarez Holguín (1490–1542) was a Spanish nobleman, military and Conquistador of Perú.

Sports
 Holguín (baseball) - a Cuban team.
 FC Holguín - a Cuban football team.